Legislative elections were held in Åland on 16 October 1983 to elect members of the Landstinget. The 30 members were elected for a four-year term by proportional representation.

The election were the last in which the Ålandic Left participated in an election.

Results

External links
Parties and Elections in Europe
Legislative Assembly elections

Aland
1983 in Finland
Elections in Åland
October 1983 events in Europe